Crash of  Moons is a 75-minute 1954 American science fiction film, consisting of three consecutive episodes of the television series Rocky Jones, Space Ranger, edited into a complete story.

Plot
Rocky Jones, a leading member of the Space Ranger force, attempts to save the inhabitants of Ophecius, a planet about to collide with a moon. However, Cleolanta - the empress of the planet - is suspicious. While Rocky and his crew succeed in evacuating the planet in time, Cleolanta's pride and vanity are a major hindrance. As the last of the planet's population leaves, Cleolanta arrogantly declares that she will stay behind. Her assistant refuses to allow this, and picks her up against her will and carries her on board Rocky's own ship, the Orbit Jet. She watches in despair as the moon crashes into her planet, the two bodies destroying one another instantly. As the ship heads for the new home that has been chosen for her people, Cleolanta realizes that she had been wrong, and that, as stated by one of her underlings, "it is the people that make a nation, not the land itself". She reconciles with Rocky and his crew, and sincerely thanks them for their efforts on her behalf and that of her people.

Cast

 Richard Crane as Rocky Jones
 Sally Mansfield as Vena Ray
 Scotty Beckett as Winky
 John Banner as Bavarro
 Nan Leslie as Trinka
 Patsy Parsons as Queen Cleolanta
 Harry Lauter as Atlasan
 Robert Lyden as Bobby
 Maurice Cass as Prof. Newton
 Charles Meredith as Secretary Drake
 Lane Bradford as Lasvon
 Rand Brooks as Andrews

Reception
The Encyclopedia of Science Fiction found the movie to be unpretentious, with many scientific inaccuracies, and while not the best of the era, but found it to be better than expected.

Production

Unlike many of the series of the era, Rocky Jones was filmed rather than being shown live. This allowed the preservation of the series while many other series of the time have been lost. The syndicated series was  usually structured in three 30 minute episode arcs. This was done to allow the episodes to be edited into movies for release on TV. The other movies in this series are Beyond the Moon, Duel in Space, Forbidden Moon, Gypsy Moon, The Magnetic Moon, Manhunt in Space, Menace from Outer Space, Renegade Satellite, and Robot of Regalio.

During the series, Beckett's arrest for armed robbery, and Cass's death, led to their characters being replaced by Biffen Cardoza (Lydon) and Professory Mayberry (Sheffield). While Cleolanta had been a frequent villain in the series, this marks the end of the character in the Rocky Jones series. Succeeding episodes contain a new villain.

It was released only on 16mm for home movie rental and television syndication. It was directed by Hollingsworth Morse. This film is now in the Public Domain in the United States.

The high cost of special effects doomed the series and further movies, although they are considered impressive for the time.

Home media
Being in the public domain, this film is available on DVD from various publishers and in multi-film packs, such as the 20 Movie Pack, "Alien Worlds" by Mill Creek publishers. The full episodes were also released as a DVD set.

The film is featured in episode 417 of Mystery Science Theater 3000 and the episode is available as part of Mystery Science Theater 3000: Volume XVIII from Shout! Factory.

As of June 2020, the episodes and movies are also presented on a dedicated Roku channel.

References

External links 
 
 
 

1954 films
1950s science fiction films
American independent films
American black-and-white films
American science fiction action films
American space adventure films
1950s English-language films
Films directed by Hollingsworth Morse
1950s American films